The Pölven is a mountain in the Kitzbühel Alps in the Lower Inn valley in the Austrian state of Tyrol.

The summit can be scaled over a small and simple Klettersteig. From the summit area there are views of Hohe Salve, Bad Häring, the Lower Inn valley, the Wilder Kaiser, the Loferer Steinberge and Söll. The ridge is one of the less well-known mountains and hence less frequented by tourists. Occasional aircraft noise interrupts the quiet atmosphere because this region is well suited to gliders due to the good  thermals.

The mountain has quarries that extract marl and limestone and are used by the cement industry in Kirchbichl.

Mountains of the Alps
Mountains of Tyrol (state)
One-thousanders of Austria
Kitzbühel Alps